Fonda F. Hawthorne (born 1956) is a former one-term member of the Arkansas House of Representatives. She represented the 4th district from 2013 to 2015 for the Democratic Party. She served on the Public Transportation, City County and Local Affairs, and Legislative Joint Auditing committees.

Hawthorne was defeated for reelection on November 4, 2014, by DeAnn Vaught, a Republican farmer from Horatio, Arkansas.  Vaught won by 59-41 percent margin in a general Republican sweep of Arkansas elections.

References

1956 births
Living people
Democratic Party members of the Arkansas House of Representatives
People from Stuttgart, Arkansas
People from Little River County, Arkansas
Baptists from Arkansas
Women state legislators in Arkansas
Ouachita Baptist University alumni
21st-century American women